Silvia Bertagna (born 30 November 1986) is an Italian freestyle skier. Silvia Bertagna competed at the 2014 Winter Olympics. She was 160th at the 2012–13 FIS Freestyle Skiing World Cup.

References

External links
 FIS Ski profile

1986 births
Living people
Italian female freestyle skiers
Freestyle skiers at the 2014 Winter Olympics
Freestyle skiers at the 2022 Winter Olympics
Olympic freestyle skiers of Italy
Sportspeople from Brixen
21st-century Italian women